N.G.O is a 1967 Indian Malayalam film, directed by S. S. Rajan and produced by K. R. Shanmugham. The film stars Sathyan, Sukumari, Adoor Bhasi and Kottayam Santha in the lead roles. The film's musical score was by B. A. Chidambaranath.

Cast
Sathyan
Prem Nazir
Sukumari
Adoor Bhasi
Kottayam Santha
Ambika
S. P. Pillai
Ushakumari

Soundtrack
The music was composed by B. A. Chidambaranath and the lyrics were written by P. Bhaskaran.

References

External links
 

1967 films
1960s Malayalam-language films